The Jerring Award ( or "Radiosportens Jerringpris") is a prize established by Radiosporten, the sport section of Sveriges Radio, voted by its radio audience who choose the Swedish athlete or team that has made the best sport performance of the year. The prize is named after Swedish radio personality Sven Jerring. It is also called "the prize of the people", since it is the radio audience who vote. There has around 2010-2019 been criticism on the fact that there has been campaigns within sports with many amateurs, so that golf and horse jumping has been awarded.

The first prize was awarded in 1979, and the winner was the alpine skier Ingemar Stenmark, and the person who has been awarded the most times is the biathlete Magdalena Forsberg, with four awards.

All winners

1979 - Ingemar Stenmark, alpine skiing
1980 - Ingemar Stenmark, alpine skiing
1981 - Annichen Kringstad, orienteering
1982 - IFK Göteborg, football men
1983 - Mats Wilander, tennis
1984 - Gunde Svan, cross-country skiing
1985 - Gunde Svan, cross-country skiing
1986 - Tomas Johansson, wrestling
1987 - Marie-Helene Westin, cross-country skiing
1988 - Tomas Gustafson, speed skating
1989 - Jan Boklöv, ski jumping
1990 - Sweden men's national handball team
1991 - Pernilla Wiberg, alpine skiing
1992 - Pernilla Wiberg, alpine skiing
1993 - Torgny Mogren, cross-country skiing
1994 - Sweden national football team
1995 - Annika Sörenstam, golf
1996 - Ludmila Engquist,  athletics
1997 - Magdalena Forsberg, biathlon
1998 - Magdalena Forsberg, biathlon
1999 - Ludmila Engquist,  athletics
2000 - Magdalena Forsberg, biathlon
2001 - Magdalena Forsberg, biathlon
2002 - Carolina Klüft, athletics
2003 - Annika Sörenstam, golf
2004 - Stefan Holm, athletics
2005 - Tony Rickardsson, speedway
2006 - Susanna Kallur,  athletics
2007 - Zlatan Ibrahimović, football
2008 - Charlotte Kalla, cross-country skiing
2009 - Helena Jonsson, biathlon
2010 - Therese Alshammar, swimming
2011 - Rolf-Göran Bengtsson, horse show jumping
2012 - Lisa Nordén, triathlon
2013 - Henrik Stenson, golf
2014 - Sarah Sjöström, swimming
2015 - Sarah Sjöström, swimming
2016 - Peder Fredricson, horse show jumping
2017 - Peder Fredricson, horse show jumping
2018 - Hanna Öberg, biathlon
2019 - Tove Alexandersson, orienteering, ski mountaineering, ski orienteering and skyrunning
2020 - Armand Duplantis, pole vault
2021 - Team Sweden, show jumping

Wins per sport

See also
Svenska Dagbladet Gold Medal

References

External links

Sport in Sweden
Awards established in 1979
1979 establishments in Sweden
Swedish sports trophies and awards